The Air Force Home Guard, is part of the Danish Home Guard. Its mission is to support the Royal Danish Air Force, the police and other national authorities in their emergency management by securing airports, performing aerial environmental patrols of national waters.

Aircraft
The Air Force Home Guard operates two leased Britten-Norman Defender BN2A-21 aircraft flown by volunteer civilian pilots. The Defenders entered service in February 2016.

Organization
The Air Force Home Guard is commanded by a full-service air force colonel. The commander is supported by a small staff of full-service personnel.

Municipalities with airfields or in the vicinity of airports have "air force home guard squadrons" – (100–150 riflemen), commanded by volunteer captains.

Squadrons
The Flying Home Guard consists of 28 squadrons and two divisions:
 HVE:  (Home Guard Squadron)
 STHVE:  (Staff Home Guard Squadron)
 FSD:  (Aircraft Home Defense Division)

See also
 Luftmeldekorpset

References

External links
 Official website (in Danish)

Home Guard
Militias in Europe
Paramilitary organizations based in Denmark
Royal Danish Air Force